Independente Esporte Clube, commonly known as Independente-AP or simply Independente, is a Brazilian multi-sport club based in Santana, Amapá. The club is most notable for its association football team, that plays in the Campeonato Amapaense, the top division in the Amapá state football league system.

The club's traditional rivals are Santana, and games between the two are known as the Clássico do Porto.

They won the Campeonato Amapaense five times.

History
The club was founded on 19 January 1962. They won the Campeonato Amapaense in 1982, 1983, 1989, 1995, and in 2001.

Stadium
Independente Esporte Clube play their home games at Estádio Antônio Vilela, nicknamed Vilelão. The stadium has a maximum capacity of 5,000 people.

Honours

Regional 

 Torneio de Integração da Amazônia
 Champions: 1989
 Runners-up: 1990

State 

 Campeonato Amapaense
 Champions (5): 1982, 1983, 1989, 1995, 2001
 Runners-up (3): 2002, 2003, 2022

 Campeonato Amapaense Segunda Divisão
 Runners-up: 1964

References

Further reading

Football clubs in Amapá
Association football clubs established in 1962
1962 establishments in Brazil